is a Japanese original net animation series produced by Studio Deen and directed by Shinobu Tagashira. It adapts various stories from Junji Ito, including The Hanging Balloons, Sōichi, and Tomie. It was released on Netflix in January 2023.

Characters

Production and release
The series was originally announced on June 8, 2022; the series was announced to adapt stories from Junji Ito's The Hanging Balloons, Sōichi, and Tomie manga. The series is set to be directed by Shinobu Tagashira and produced by Studio Deen, with Kaoru Sawada writing the scripts and Yuki Hayashi composing the music. The series premiered on Netflix on January 19, 2023.

References

External links
  
 

2023 anime ONAs
Anime series based on manga
Animation anthology series
Horror anime and manga
Fiction about monsters
Japanese-language Netflix original programming
Japanese anthology television series
Netflix original anime
Studio Deen